The 1978 UMass Minutemen football team represented the University of Massachusetts Amherst in the 1978 NCAA Division I-AA football season as a member of the Yankee Conference. The team was coached by Bob Pickett and played its home games at Alumni Stadium in Hadley, Massachusetts. The 1978 season was the first after the NCAA split Division I football into two subdivisions, and the first that featured a postseason playoff for Division I-AA. The Minutemen reached this inaugural championship game, losing to Florida A&M, 35–28. UMass finished the season with a record of 9–4 overall and 5–0 in conference play.

Schedule

References

UMass
UMass Minutemen football seasons
Yankee Conference football champion seasons
Umass Minutemen football